Krusa may refer to:

Kruså, Danish town
Krusa (genus), a genus of Arachnids

See also
Velika Kruša